John Bozman Kerr (March 5, 1809 – January 27, 1878) was a U.S. Congressman, representing the sixth district of the state of Maryland from 1849 until 1851. He also served as Chargé d'Affaires to Nicaragua.

Early life
John Bozman Kerr was born in Easton, Maryland to John Leeds Kerr, and attended the common schools and Easton Academy. He graduated from Harvard University in 1830, studied law further, and was admitted to the bar and commenced practice in Easton in 1833.

Career
Kerr served as a member of the Maryland House of Delegates from 1836 until 1838, and later as deputy attorney general for Talbot County from 1845 until 1848.

Kerr was elected as a Whig to the Thirty-first Congress, serving from March 4, 1849, until March 3, 1851, and was not a candidate for renomination in 1850. He was appointed by President Millard Fillmore Chargé d'Affaires to Nicaragua on March 7, 1851, and served until July 27, 1853. Kerr resumed the practice of law in Baltimore and St. Michaels, Maryland, in 1854.

Kerr was appointed one of the solicitors in the Court of Claims in Washington, D.C., and served from February 8, 1864, to June 25, 1868, when the position was abolished. He served as solicitor in the office of the Sixth Auditor of the Treasury Department from November 6, 1869, until his death.

Personal life
Kerr was married and had five sons and four daughters.

Death
Kerr died on January 27, 1878, in Washington, D.C. He was interred at his family's cemetery in Eastern Shore.

From the journal of his daughter, Henrietta Maria Kerr:

Papa was born March 1809, and graduated at Harvard University in 1830. Among his classmates were Oliver Wendell Holmes, "the Poet of the North"; Hon. Charles T. Sumner, and John O. Sargent. On leaving college in 1834 he took a trip to the West Indies and Cuba, and a few years later settled in Easton to practice law. In 1850 he was elected to Congress. The following year he was sent as minister to Central America and remained there nearly three years. On his return from South America Papa settled at St. Michaels, until 1869, when he was appointed a solicitor in the Court of Claims at Washington and removed us all to this city.

Our noble, good, kind Father was taken from us very suddenly. On Sunday January 27, 1878, after a few hours illness of Angina Pectoris, he fell asleep, and entered into eternal rest. I never can forget that gray cold Sunday Morning, and the terrible feeling at my heart when I heard the Church bells ring out through the Sabbath stillness, and realized at last that he would never go to Church with us again-a thing he had never missed. He rests in the old family burial ground at Belleville, beside his loved parents and son.-In nature, I think Papa was more nearly perfect than anyone I ever knew. A good loving husband and the sweetest kindest Father, always ready and anxious to entertain and instruct his children, no matter how deeply engaged he might be. He was a scholar and a Christian gentleman, in every sense of that grand old word, and although the latter days of his life were full of cares and troubles, his sunny, kindly nature never changed; even in acute physical pain, he never failed in his loving tender care for us all.

References

External links
 
 Belleville Cemetery

|-

1809 births
1878 deaths
People from Easton, Maryland
Harvard University alumni
19th-century American diplomats
19th-century American politicians
Members of the Maryland House of Delegates
Whig Party members of the United States House of Representatives from Maryland